The  is a denomination of Japanese yen, that was first issued on July 19, 2000 to commemorate the 26th G8 Summit and the millennium. The banknote is notable for not being a commemorative banknote under Japanese law, and circulates as a regular issue. It is also the only currency using a number 2 denomination.

History

The  ¥2,000 note was first issued on July 19, 2000 under the "D Series". It was not reissued when notes were rereleased in later series.

The design is similar to that of the other Japanese notes in circulation at the time of issue. The obverse has a serial number and depicts Shureimon, a 16th-century gate at Shuri Castle in Naha, in Okinawa Prefecture, Japan.  Cherry blossom and chrysanthemum motifs are part of the linear design work in the background. The reverse side depicts a scene from The Tale of Genji, and a portrait of Murasaki Shikibu, the noblewoman to whom this work of classic literature has been attributed. A copy of a portion of script from the original work is included.

Rarity
The rarity of ¥2,000 notes in circulation is linked to the few vending machines or ATMs that accept the denomination. Overall public opinion has been negative as the denomination is inconvenient to use, and is a nuisance to cashiers and business owners that use registers with no slot for the bills. The Bank of Japan has also weighed in by giving factors such as the debut of "Series E" 2004 dated notes which entered into circulation. A spokesperson for the bank later stated in 2006 that “I think people prefer to hold on to the newer bank notes” when referring to "Series E" in comparison. The Bank of Japan stopped producing ¥2,000 notes in 2004 when there were 513 million of them in circulation. This figure dropped to 111 million by 2010 when it was recorded that ¥2,000 notes made up just around 0.9% of all notes in circulation.

It was reported in 2019 that The Bank of Japan is not printing new notes as they continue to hold large amounts of them in reserve. The note does enjoy some popularity in Okinawa due to the representation of Shureimon on the note's obverse; some ATMs allow users to specifically withdraw ¥2,000 notes in addition to other denominations. Collectors have since taken notice of their rarity in circulation as the notes trade above their face value in online sales.

See also

Banknotes of the Japanese yen
United States two-dollar bill - another banknote denomination of roughly one-tenth the value that is similarly rarely seen in circulation and likewise available upon request from banks.

References

Japanese yen banknotes
Two-thousand-base-unit banknotes
Murasaki Shikibu